The 1937 European Wrestling Championshipswere held in  the men's Freestyle style  in Munchen 29-31 October 1937; the Greco-Romane style and  in Paris 20 - 22 May 1937.

Medal table

Medal summary

Men's freestyle

Men's Greco-Roman

References

External links
FILA Database

W
W
European Wrestling Championships
Euro
Euro
Sports competitions in Munich
Sports competitions in Paris
1937 in European sport